Winnemucca Mountain is a mountain near the small city of Winnemucca in Humboldt County, Nevada, United States. It is considered to be the southernmost named summit of the Santa Rosa Range. A paved road ascends to radio facilities on the summit.

References

External links

Mountains of Nevada
Landforms of Humboldt County, Nevada
Mountain